Paralcidion bilineatum is a species of beetle in the family Cerambycidae, the only species in the genus Paralcidion.

References

Acanthocinini